Ruzha Lazarova (Bulgarian Cyrillic,  Ружа Лазарова; Sofia, 1968) is a Bulgarian French language writer who currently lives in Paris. 

She studied at the Lycée Français de Sofia and she later studied French literature at the Sofia University.  She started publishing short stories in Bulgarian and was awarded with Young Prose Bulgarian Prize in 1990. She has also published two short stories in French and a play, which was performed at the “Festival de la Correspondance” in Grignan.

Novels
Sur le bout de la langue (1998)
Cœurs croisés (Flammarion, 2000)
Frein (Balland, 2004)
Mausolée (Flammarion, 2009)

References

External links
Writer's website

1968 births
Living people
Writers from Sofia
European writers in French
Bulgarian expatriates in France
Bulgarian women writers